True thrushes are medium-sized mostly insectivorous or omnivorous birds in the genus Turdus of the wider thrush family, Turdidae. The genus name Turdus is Latin for "thrush". The term "thrush" is used for many other birds of the family Turdidae as well as for a number of species belonging to several other families.

The genus has a cosmopolitan distribution, with species in the Americas, Europe, Asia, Africa and Australia. Several species have also colonised some oceanic islands, and two species have been introduced to New Zealand. Some New World species are called robins, the most well known of which is the American robin. Several species are migratory.

While some species are often split out of Turdus, the two small thrushes formerly separated in Platycichla by many authors have been restored to the present genus in recent years.

Taxonomy and systematics
The genus Turdus was introduced by the Swedish naturalist Carl Linnaeus in 1758 in the tenth edition of his Systema Naturae. The type species was subsequently designated as the mistle thrush. The name Turdus is the Latin word for a "thrush".

Current species
Eighty-nine extant species and one extinct species are recognized:

Former species
Formerly, some authorities also considered the following species (or subspecies) as species within the genus Turdus:
 Rufous whistler (as Turdus pectoralis or Turdus prasinus)
 Grey shrikethrush (as Turdus harmonicus)
 †South Island piopio (as Turdus crassirostus)
 Ethiopian oriole (as Turdus monacha)
 Restless flycatcher (as Turdus inquietus)
 Black-headed bulbul (as Turdus atriceps)
 Ruby-throated bulbul (as Turdus dispar)
 Red-vented bulbul (as Turdus cafer)
 Sooty-headed bulbul (as Turdus aurigaster)
 African red-eyed bulbul (as Turdus aurigaster)
 Cape bulbul (as Turdus capensis)
 Common bulbul (as Turdus barbatus)
 Egyptian bulbul (as Turdus Arsinoe)
 Orange-spotted bulbul (as Turdus bimaculatus)
 Yellow-vented bulbul (analis) (as Turdus analis)
 Sombre greenbul (as Turdus importunus)
 Réunion bulbul (as Turdus Borbonicus)
 Mauritius bulbul (as Turdus atricilla)
 Malagasy bulbul (as Turdus Madagascariensis)
 Black bulbul (as Turdus leucocephalus)
 Philippine bulbul (as Turdus philippinus)
 Brown-eared bulbul (as Turdus amaurotis)

References

Further reading

External links

Videos, photos and sounds - The Internet Bird Collection

Turdidae
 
Taxa named by Carl Linnaeus